Rivina humilis is a species of flowering plant in the family Petiveriaceae. It was formerly placed in the pokeweed family, Phytolaccaceae.  It can be found in the southern United States, the Caribbean, Central America, and tropical South America. Common names include pigeonberry, rougeplant, baby peppers, bloodberry, and coralito. The specific epithet means "dwarfish" or "lowly" in Latin, referring to the plant's short stature.

Description
The fruit is a glossy, bright red berry  in diameter.

Habitat
It requires less than partial sun and is tolerant of full shade. It is also tolerant of salt spray and saline soils.

It is considered invasive in New Caledonia, where it was likely introduced in 1900. It is considered a weed in Queensland, Australia where it has naturalised, and is also naturalised on Cocos Islands, Réunion, Norfolk Island, Fiji, Tonga, French Polynesia, Hawaii, India and the Galapagos Islands.

Uses 
Pigeonberry is cultivated as an ornamental in warm regions throughout the world and is valued as a shade-tolerant groundcover. It is also grown as a houseplant  and in greenhouses.

The juice made from the berries was used as a dye and ink at one time. The berries contain a pigment known as rivianin or rivinianin, which has the IUPAC name 5-O-β-D-Glucopyranoside, 3-sulfate, CAS number 58115-21-2, and molecular formula C24H26N2O16S. It is very similar to betanin, the pigment found in beets. The fruit also contains the betaxanthin humilixanthin.

The juice of the berries have been tested in male rats and are reported to be safe to consume.

Ecology
R. humilis is a host plant for the caterpillars of Goodson's greenstreak (Cyanophrys goodsoni)

References

External links
Rivina humilis can also be found in the Philippines from the Int'l Society for Taxonomic Explorations by Isidro A. T. Savillo

Petiveriaceae
Plants described in 1753
Taxa named by Carl Linnaeus
Flora of Arizona
Flora of the Caribbean
Flora of Central America
Flora of Mexico
Flora of New Mexico
Flora of Oklahoma
Flora of South America
Flora of the Southeastern United States
Flora of Texas
Flora without expected TNC conservation status